The Stars Shine is a 1938 German musical revue directed by Hans H. Zerlett and written by Zerlett and Hans Hannes.

Synopsis
A young secretary leaves the country and travels to Berlin to seek work as an actress. In a comedy of errors, she is mistaken for a famous dancer, which results in her heading the cast of a star-studded musical. The plot acts as a backdrop for this musical revue film, which includes many German film, sports, and entertainment stars of the 1930s.

Background
Es leuchten die Sterne was a remake of the 1930 Tobis film Die Große Sehnsucht (The Great Yearning), directed by Stefan Szekely, a Hungarian Jew. The remake was created as a Busby Berkeley-style musical set inside a movie studio, and featured appearances by numerous stage personalities, athletes, and Tobis Films stars. Joseph Goebbels was Propaganda Minister and considered entertainment films to be the best type of media with which to convey the political message of the Nazi regime. Es leuchten die Sterne was created, as were many German films of the period, to act as a propaganda piece promoting the Third Reich as a cultural entity.

Release
The film was first released in Germany on 17 March 1938. This was followed by a release in the Netherlands on 29 April, and then in the United States on 20 May as The Stars Shine. It was released in various countries under different titles: in Belgium as Als de sterren schitteren (Flemish) and as Quand les étoiles brillent (French); in Italy as Brillano le stelle; in Denmark as Funklende stjerner; in Greece as Lampoun t' asteria; in France as Les étoiles brillent and as Vedettes follies; and in the Netherlands as Parade der sterren and Sterrenparade. The film was released on DVD in its original German version on 21 July 2008 by Warner Home Video.

Excerpts from the film were shown on German television in 1938, with La Jana present in the studio.

Cast

Featured appearances

References

External links
 
 Es Leuchten Die Sterne at Allmovie

1938 films
1938 musical comedy films
German musical comedy films
Films of Nazi Germany
1930s German-language films
Films directed by Hans H. Zerlett
Films about filmmaking
Films set in Berlin
German black-and-white films
Tobis Film films
1930s German films